Real Robots was the name of a fortnightly partwork magazine by Eaglemoss Publications, established in May, 2001. Developed in partnership with Reading University, it allowed the reader to build a robot, "Cybot", and later a companion robot, "Tom". This series, which was released in eight countries, is now discontinued.

Construction phases 
There were 96 issues of the magazine, divided into 5 phases:
 Phase 1 - Issues 1 to 17 - Cybot is built, and is able to follow lines on the floor, and sense light and objects.
 Phase 2 - Issues 18 to 40 - A remote control is built, along with a docking station, allowing Cybot to be programmed. Some issues also contain alternate body pieces, transforming Cybot into a 'Team Cybot', a formula-1 styled robot.
 Phase 3 - Issues 41 to 55 - Cybot becomes voice controlled with the addition of a headset to wear and some additional components for the remote control.
 Phase 4 - Issues 56 to 70 - Cybot learns to play 'football'. Infrared location sensors are added to Cybot, as well as Infrared beacons in the form of a ball and a goal.
 Phase 5 - Issues 71 to 96 - TOM (Tracking Orbital Module) is built. TOM is a smaller robot than Cybot, with a similar look. Its features include scanning sonar, a higher speed, full programmability, 'emotions', and interaction with Cybot.

See also 
Kevin Warwick

External links 
 Eaglemoss Publications
 Archive of realrobots.co.uk
 Archive of Realcybot.com
 Archive of Cybotbuilder.com

References

Biweekly magazines published in the United Kingdom
Robotics magazines
Partworks
Magazines established in 2001
Magazines disestablished in 2005
Defunct computer magazines published in the United Kingdom